Guacamayo Island is a river island south of Valdivia, south-central Chile. Next to it to the west lies the larger island of Isla del Rey.

The etymology of the island is not Mapudungun.

References

Islands of Los Ríos Region
River islands of Chile